FormFlow was the name of a line of electronic forms products initially created and sold by Delrina in the early- to mid-1990s.

History 
The first product in this line was PerForm, which was designed to work under GEM in DOS. The FormFlow and FormFlow PRO products that succeeded PerForm were designed to work on Windows 3.1.

Delrina was bought by Symantec late in 1995, and the electronic forms division was sold to JetForm in 1996. JetForm, which later changed its name to Accelio, was in turn was bought by Adobe Systems, and the electronic forms products were officially end-of-lifed in 2004.

External links
Legacy JetForm/Accelio Form Products FAQ, PDF, accessed November 3, 2005

Business software